Afghanistan Times, also known as The Afghanistan Times Daily, is an independent, English language newspaper owned by Rana Think Tanks and published in Kabul, Afghanistan. Established in 2005, the newspaper is published on 12 pages containing latest news, including Afghan politics and cultural issues. The newspaper is published in both print and online formats.

Staff
The Afghanistan Times Daily has chief editor, sub-editors, journalists, graphic designers and translators, all of whom are managed by an editorial board. Members of the editorial board include Sharif Fayez (former head of Afghanistan Investment Support Agency), Omar Zakhilwal, Sultana Parwanta, Sharifa Sharif and Saduddin Shpoon (former producer of Afghanistan's Voice Of America (VOA) radio programming).

The paper also has a management, finance and marketing department, whose work is guided by a board of directors. The board of directors are primarily responsible for overseeing financial and marketing issues, including the paper's advertising and subscription policies.

See also 
 Mass media in Afghanistan

References

External links
 Official website
 

English-language newspapers published in Asia
Publications established in 2005
Daily newspapers published in Afghanistan
Mass media in Kabul
2005 establishments in Afghanistan